The U.S. state of Idaho borders six other U.S. states and one Canadian province. The states of Washington and Oregon are to the west, Nevada and Utah are to the south, and Montana and Wyoming are to the east. Idaho also shares a short border with the Canadian province of British Columbia to the north.

Overview
The landscape is rugged, with some of the largest unspoiled natural areas in the United States. For example, at 2.3 million acres (930,000 ha), the Frank Church-River of No Return Wilderness Area is the largest contiguous area of protected wilderness in the continental United States. Idaho is a Rocky Mountain state with abundant natural resources and scenic areas. The state has snow-capped mountain ranges, rapids, vast lakes and steep canyons. The waters of the Snake River run through Hells Canyon, the deepest gorge in the United States. Shoshone Falls falls down cliffs from a height greater than Niagara Falls.

By far, the most important river in Idaho is the Snake River, a major tributary of the Columbia River. The Snake River flows out from Yellowstone in northwestern Wyoming through the Snake River Plain in southern Idaho before turning north, leaving the state at Lewiston before joining the Columbia in Kennewick. Other major rivers are the Clark Fork/Pend Oreille River, the Spokane River, and, many major tributaries of the Snake River, including the Clearwater River, the Salmon River, the Boise River, and the Payette River. The Salmon River empties into the Snake in Hells Canyon and forms the southern boundary of Nez Perce County on its north shore, of which Lewiston is the county seat. The Port of Lewiston, at the confluence of the Clearwater and the Snake Rivers is the farthest inland seaport on the West Coast at 465 river miles from the Pacific at Astoria, Oregon.

The vast majority of Idaho's population lives in the Snake River Plain, a valley running from across the entirety of southern Idaho from east to west. The valley contains the major cities of Boise, Meridian, Nampa, Caldwell, Twin Falls, Idaho Falls, and Pocatello. The plain served as an easy pass through the Rocky Mountains for westward-bound settlers on the Oregon Trail, and many settlers chose to settle the area rather than risking the treacherous route through the Blue Mountains and the Cascade Range to the west. The western region of the plain is known as the Treasure Valley, bound between the Owyhee Mountains to the southwest and the Boise Mountains to the northeast. The central region of the Snake River Plain is known as the Magic Valley.

Idaho's highest point is Borah Peak, in the Lost River Range north of Mackay. In 1983, an earthquake there caused two fatalities. Idaho's lowest point, is in Lewiston, where the Clearwater River joins the Snake River and continues into Washington. The Sawtooth Range is often considered Idaho's most famous mountain range. Other mountain ranges in Idaho include the Bitterroot Range, the White Cloud Mountains, the Lost River Range, the Clearwater Mountains, and the Salmon River Mountains. The only active glacier in Idaho is at Borah Peak.

Salmon-Challis National Forest is located in the east central sections of the state, with Salmon National Forest to the north and Challis National Forest to the south.

Idaho has two time zones, with the dividing line approximately midway between Canada and Nevada. Southern Idaho, including the Boise metropolitan area, Idaho Falls, Pocatello, and Twin Falls, are in the Mountain Time Zone. A legislative error ( §264) theoretically placed this region in the Central Time Zone, but this was corrected with a 2007 amendment. Areas north of the Salmon River, including Coeur d'Alene, Moscow, Lewiston, and Sandpoint, are in the Pacific Time Zone, which contains less than a quarter of the state's population and land area.

Climate

Idaho's climate varies widely. This influence has a moderating effect in the winter where temperatures are not as low as would otherwise be expected for a northern state with predominantly high elevations. In the panhandle, moist air masses from the coast are released as precipitation over the North Central Rockies forests, creating the North American inland temperate rainforest. The maritime influence is least prominent in the state's eastern part where the precipitation patterns are often reversed, with wetter summers and drier winters, and seasonal temperature differences are more extreme, showing a more semi-arid continental climate.

Hot summer days are tempered by the low relative humidity and cooler evenings during summer months since, for most of the state, the highest diurnal difference in temperature is often in the summer. Winters can be cold, although extended periods of bitter cold weather below zero are unusual.

Climate data

Lakes and rivers

Protected areas

As of 2018:

National parks, reserves, monuments and historic sites

 Salmon-Challis National Forest
 California National Historic Trail
 City of Rocks National Reserve
 Craters of the Moon National Monument and Preserve
 Hagerman Fossil Beds National Monument
 Lewis and Clark National Historic Trail
 Minidoka National Historic Site
 Nez Perce National Historical Park
 Oregon National Historic Trail
 Yellowstone National Park
 Pacific Northwest National Scenic Trail

National recreation areas

National wildlife refuges and Wilderness Areas

National conservation areas
 Snake River Birds of Prey National Conservation Area

State parks

See also
 Climate of Oregon
 Geography of Montana

Notes

References